The IMOCA 60 Class yacht Solo obtained sponsorship and became PRB - Solo Nantes was designed by Paul Lucas and launched in the August 1991 after being built by 	Alu Marine, France.

Racing results

References 

Individual sailing vessels
1990s sailing yachts
Sailing type designs by Paul Lucas
Vendée Globe boats
IMOCA 60